Josiah Taft (April 2, 1709 – September 30, 1756) was a wealthy landowner in Uxbridge, Massachusetts best known as the husband of Lydia Taft, the first woman to vote in America.

Early life
Josiah was born on April 2, 1709, at Mendon, Province of Massachusetts Bay, the son of Daniel and Lidia (Chapin) Taft, and the grandson of the first American Taft, Robert Taft, Sr. Josiah's father Daniel, had been a local "squire" and Justice of the Peace. Josiah grew up in the western part of Mendon which became the incorporated town of Uxbridge in 1727.

Marriage and adulthood
Taft married Lydia Chapin of Mendon, on December 28, 1731, (as recorded in Mendon vital records of Taft marriages), and she became known as Lydia Chapin Taft. They were married at the Congregational Church in Mendon.
Lydia and Josiah then settled in Uxbridge. It is possible that when they settled in Uxbridge that they then joined the only Uxbridge church, a Congregational church, gathered in 1727, and mentioned first in a list of new Congregational parishes in the Great Awakening of 1731. Josiah was a prominent landowner. The famous Taft family in America had ts origins in Uxbridge and Mendon, starting with Josiah's grandfather, an English immigrant, Robert Taft, Sr who settled here in 1680. Josiah and Lydia went on to have a family of 8 children between 1732 and 1753. Josiah was a farmer, and soldier, and Lydia was a colonial mother and homemaker. Josiah became a prominent citizen in early Uxbridge. He was a farmer, local official, and Massachusetts legislator.
Josiah went on to serve a number of terms as a member of the Board of Selectmen, as town clerk, and as town moderator.  Josiah served in the Massachusetts General Court. HR, 1753. Lydia and Josiah were among the wealthiest families in Uxbridge.

Place in early American history
Taft was originally known as Ensign Josiah Taft in the Uxbridge Militia, and later as Lieutenant, and then Captain Josiah Taft in the French and Indian War. Josiah served as the Uxbridge town moderator. He presided over the proceedings of the New England style open town meeting. It is later reported, that Josiah Taft became the largest taxpayer in the town of Uxbridge in 1756. In the Fall of 1756, Josiah and Lydia's 18-year-old son, Caleb, became ill, while studying at Harvard, and died on September 19. Josiah went to Boston and Cambridge to bury Caleb. Josiah himself became ill after returning home, and died on September 30, at Uxbridge, Massachusetts at age 47. It was reported that he left a good estate with bonds and a will. This was immediately prior to an important vote on the town's support for the war effort in the French and Indian Wars. Josiah's untimely death opened the door for Lydia's giant step into America's history of women's suffrage. Lydia, Josiah's widow, then became America's First Woman Voter, known initially in records as the 'widow Josiah Taft'. Lydia went on to vote in three official Uxbridge town meetings, in 1756, 1758, and 1765.

References 

Taft family
1709 births
1756 deaths
People from Mendon, Massachusetts
Members of the colonial Massachusetts House of Representatives
18th-century American politicians